Tom Malantaki (also Romanized as Tom Malantakī) is a village in Cheraghabad Rural District, Tukahur District, Minab County, Hormozgan Province, Iran. At the 2006 census, its population was 623, in 121 families.

References 

Populated places in Minab County